George Washington "Buddy" Darden III (born November 22, 1943) is an American politician and lawyer from Georgia. He served in the state house and then for more than five terms as Congressman from Georgia.

Early life
Darden was born in Hancock County, Georgia. He lived in Sparta, Georgia and attended public schools, graduating from Sparta High School in 1961. He earned his Bachelor of Arts (A.B.) at the University of Georgia (UGA) in Athens in 1965 and Bachelor of Laws and Juris Doctor from the UGA School of Law in 1967 and 1969. He received many honors and awards while a college student, including being elected as president of the student body.

Career

Law
Upon graduation from law school, Darden started his law career as assistant district attorney in Cobb County, Georgia, serving from 1968 to 1972. He was elected as County District Attorney and served from 1973 to 1977.

Legislative
In 1980 Darden was elected to the Georgia House of Representatives as a Democrat representing District 19-Post3 (Cobb County). He took office in January 1981, and served until 1983, when he resigned to campaign for an open Congressional seat.

Congress
Upon the sudden death of U.S. Representative Larry McDonald, who was killed in the 1983 downing of Korean Air Lines Flight 007, Darden won a special election to fill McDonald's seat for the remainder of the Ninety-eighth Congress. He resigned from the Georgia General Assembly.

During his tenure in office, Darden sponsored 61 bills, including H.R.2044, legislation that authorize and directs the National Park Service to assist the State of Georgia in relocating a highway affecting the Chickamauga and Chattanooga National Military Park in Georgia. Darden shepherded numerous bills, including those benefiting Lockheed Aeronautical Corp., through Congress as part of the Armed Services Committee and co-sponsored others. "You don't have to introduce a tiny little bill with your name on it to make a difference," he said.

Darden was a member of the Standards of Official Conduct committee, elected in 1991, and served on the Committee on Armed Services and Committee on Interior and Insular Affairs.

Darden has supported socially conservative positions: he opposed federal funding for Medicaid abortions except in cases of rape, incest or threat to the life of the mother. He supported the death penalty. Darden advocated maintaining a strong defense in spite of improved East-West relations. He said any money saved from a "peace dividend" should go to deficit reduction. In 1992, the Americans for Democratic Action gave Darden's 1991 voting record 40 points out of 100; the American Conservative Union gave him 35 points.

He was reelected to five more terms until 1994, when he was defeated by Bob Barr. He sought the Democratic nomination for his old seat, now numbered as the 11th district, in 2002, but lost to Roger Kahn. He was the last white Democrat to represent the Atlanta suburbs until Carolyn Bourdeaux was elected from a nearby district in 2020.

After Congress
Since leaving Congress, Darden has served as a delegate to the Democratic National Conventions in 1996, 2000 and 2004. In 2000, President Clinton announced the recess appointment of Darden to serve as a Member of the Board of Directors of the Overseas Private Investment Corporation (OPIC). Darden also served as chairman of the Judicial Nominating Commission in the administration of Georgia Governor Roy Barnes from 1999 to 2003.

In 1992, Darden became a member of the Board of Trustees for LaGrange College in LaGrange, Georgia. In 2002, Darden was named Chairman of the Board of Trustees, and served for five years.  He retired as Chair in 2007. In recognition of his service to the college, LaGrange College conferred on him an honorary Doctor of Laws degree on May 19, 2007. As is customary, Darden was the commencement speaker at the graduation ceremony during which he was honored.

Darden is a member of the ReFormers Caucus of Issue One.

Since 1995, Darden has been a partner in the Atlanta law firm of Denton's (formerly Long, Aldridge & Norman, then McKenna, Long & Aldridge). In 2018, he left Denton's to join Atlanta law firm Pope McGlamry as senior counsel.

Personal life
Darden married Lillian Budd (born May 15, 1945) on February 18, 1968. They had two children together: Lillian Christine (born December 17, 1971; now married and known as Christine Darden Brennan) and George Washington IV Darden (born August 7, 1974). Darden currently resides in Marietta, Georgia.

References

External links
 

Georgia (U.S. state) lawyers
University of Georgia alumni
LaGrange College
Democratic Party members of the Georgia House of Representatives
1943 births
Living people
People from Sparta, Georgia
Democratic Party members of the United States House of Representatives from Georgia (U.S. state)
20th-century American politicians
21st-century American politicians
Candidates in the 2002 United States elections
District attorneys in Georgia (U.S. state)
Members of Congress who became lobbyists